The Nakajima G5N Shinzan ("Deep Mountain") was a four-engined long-range heavy bomber designed and built for the Imperial Japanese Navy prior to World War II. The Navy designation was "Experimental 13-Shi Attack Bomber"; the Allied code name was "Liz".

Design and development

To meet this requirement, it became apparent a four-engine lay-out would be necessary. As Japanese aircraft manufacturers lacked experience in building such large complex aircraft, the Navy was forced to search for a suitable existing foreign-made model upon which to base the new design. It settled on the American Douglas DC-4E airliner. In 1939 the sole prototype of this airliner (previously rejected by American airline companies) was purchased by Nippon Koku K.K. (Japan Airlines Co) and clandestinely handed over to the Nakajima Aircraft Company for dismantling and inspection.

The design that emerged from this study was for an all-metal mid-wing monoplane with fabric-covered control surfaces and powered by four 1,870 hp Nakajima NK7A Mamori 11 air-cooled radial engines driving four-bladed propellers. A long ventral bomb-bay, glazed nose and twin tailfins replacing the DC-4E's distinctive triple rudder were included. The DC-4E's retractable tricycle undercarriage was retained, as well as the original wing form and powerplant arrangement. Defensive armament comprised two 20mm Type 99 Model 1 cannon (one in a power-operated dorsal and one in a tail turret), plus single-mount hand-operated 7.7mm Type 92 machine guns in the nose, ventral and waist positions.

The first prototype G5N1 made its maiden flight on 14:35 8 April 1941. Overall performance proved disappointingly poor however, due to a combination of excessive weight, the unreliability of the Mamori engines and the complexity of the design. Only three more prototypes were completed. In an attempt to salvage the project, two additional airframes were fitted with 1,530 hp Mitsubishi MK4B 12 "Kasei" engines and redesignated G5N2s. Although the Mitsubishi engines were more reliable than the original Mamori 11s, the aircraft was now even more hopelessly underpowered and further development of the type was halted.

Operational history
Of the six completed Shinzans, four were relegated for use as long-range Navy transports under the designation G5N2-L Shinzan-Kai Transport. The Allies allocated the  code-name "Liz" to the aircraft, in the expectation it would be used as a bomber.

Variants

G5N1 Experimental Type 13 Land-based Attack Bomber "Shinzan" ( 13-Shi Rikujō Kōgekiki "Shinzan") Prototype, two built. Initial named Experimental Type 13 Large-size land-based Attack Bomber ( 13-Shi Ōgata Rikujō Kōgekiki). Four-engined heavy bomber/torpedo bomber. Three-blade propeller, mounted four Mitsubishi MK4B Kasei 12 (1,530 hp) radial engines.
G5N2 Test production "Shinzan Kai" ( Shisei "Shinzan Kai") Supplementary prototype, four built. Four-blade propeller, mounted four Nakajima NK7A Mamori 11 (1,870 hp) radial engines. All G5N2s were rebuilt to G5N2-L in 1943.
G5N2-L "Shinzan Kai" Freighter ( "Sinzan Kai" Yusōki) Long-range Navy transport conversion. All G5N2-Ls were deployed to 1021st Kōkutai, Katori Air Base.
Nakajima Ki-68 Proposed Army bomber prototype version of the G5N1. Engines were planned Mitsubishi Ha-101, Ha-104, Ha-107, Nakajima Ha-39 or Ha-103 engines. Discontinued in 1941.
Kawasaki Ki-85 Proposed Army bomber version of the G5N1. Four Mitsubishi Ha-111M engines. Full-scale mock-up was built in 1942, discontinued in May 1943.

Operators

Imperial Japanese Navy Air Service
1021st Kōkutai

Specifications (G5N2)

See also

References

Notes

Bibliography

 Collier, Basil. Japanese Aircraft of World War II. New York: Mayflower Books, 1979. .
 
Famous Airplanes of the World, Bunrindō (Japan)
No. 90 Nakajima, Navy heavy experimental attack bomber Shinzan / Renzan, October 1977.
No. 146 Nakajima Shinzan / Renzan, November 1984.
Illustrated warplane history #5 Imperial Japanese Navy warplane, Green Arrow publishing (Japan), June 1994.

External links

G05N, Nakajima
G05N
Abandoned military aircraft projects of Japan
Four-engined tractor aircraft
Mid-wing aircraft
Aircraft first flown in 1941
Four-engined piston aircraft